The 2007 World Figure Skating Championships was a senior international figure skating competition sanctioned by the International Skating Union. Medals were awarded in the disciplines of men's singles, ladies' singles, pair skating, and ice dancing. The event was held at the Tokyo Metropolitan Gymnasium in Tokyo, Japan from March 20 to 25.

Medals table

Competition notes
The competition was open to skaters from ISU member nations who had reached the age of 15 by July 1, 2006. The corresponding competition for younger skaters was the 2007 World Junior Championships.

Based on the results of the 2006 World Championships, each country was allowed between one and three entries per discipline. National associations selected their entries based on their own criteria.

Due to the large number of entries at the World Championships, only the top 24 single skaters and top 20 pairs advanced to the free skating after the short program. In ice dancing, the top 30 couples in the compulsory dance advanced to the original dance, and the top 24 couples after the original dance advanced to the free dance.

Yukari Nakano and Carolina Kostner tied for 5th place with 168.92 points overall. Nakano finished 5th place on the tiebreak (free skating placement) and Kostner ended 6th. In the ladies' event, two world records were set: Yuna Kim for the short program with a score of 71.95, and Mao Asada for the free skating with a score of 133.13.

Shen Xue / Zhao Hongbo from China set a new world record of 71.07 points under the ISU Judging System for pairs' short program. Zhao proposed marriage to Shen on the ice following their free skating.

Results

Men

Referee:
 Paolo Pizzocari 

Technical Controller:
 Gale Tanger 

Technical Specialist:
 Ricardo Olavarrieta 

Assistant Technical Specialist:
 Margus Hernitz 

Judges for the men's short program:
 Albert Zaydman 
 Nikolai Ianev 
 Adriana Domanska 
 Nicolai Bellu 
 Alexei Shirshov 
 Hermann Schulz 
 Sviatoslav Babenko 
 Neil Garrard 
 Inger Andersson 
 Claudia Fassora 
 Susan Johnson 
 Ubavka Novakovic-Kutinou 

Judges for the men's free skating:
 Nicolai Bellu 
 Philippe Meriguet 
 Inger Andersson 
 Albert Zaydman 
 Patricia Houghton 
 Claudia Fassora 
 Hermann Schulz 
 Nikolai Ianev 
 Alexei Shirshov 
 Susan Johnson 
 Deborah Islam 
 Sviatoslav Babenko

Ladies

Referee:
 Marina Sanaya 

Technical Controller:
 Charles Cyr 

Technical Specialist:
 Ravi Walia 

Assistant Technical Specialist:
 Isabel Duval de Navarre 

Judges for the ladies' short program:
 Katalin Balczo 
 Robert Rosenbluth 
 Lenka Bohunicka 
 Adriana Ordeanu 
 Antica Grubisic 
 Chihee Rhee 
 Osman Sirvan 
 Franco Benini 
 Deborah Islam 
 Nikolai Salnikov 
 Mona Jonsson 
 Christiane Mörth 

Judges for the ladies' free skating:
 Adriana Ordeanu 
 Robert Rosenbluth 
 Katalin Balczo 
 Deborah Islam 
 Elisabeth Louesdon 
 Mona Jonsson 
 Masako Kubota 
 Hely Abbondati 
 Elena Fomina 
 Lenka Bohunicka 
 Nikolai Salnikov 
 Christiane Mörth

Pairs

Referee:
 Igor Prokop 

Technical Controller:
 Alexander Lakernik 

Technical Specialist:
 David Kirby 

Assistant Technical Specialist:
 David Moellenkamp 

Judges for the pairs short program:
 Chihee Rhee 
 Anna Sierocka 
 Evgeni Rokhin 
 Yumin Wang 
 Jan Hoffmann 
 Florence Catry De Surmont 
 Vladislav Petukhov 
 Susan Heffernan 
 Linda Leaver 
 Alexander Kogan 
 Alexander Penchev 
 Simone Moore 

Judges for the pairs free skating:
 Christiane Mörth 
 Anna Sierocka 
 Simone Moore 
 Alexander Kogan 
 Lenka Bohunicka 
 Franco Benini 
 Nikolai Salnikov 
 Yumin Wang 
 Susan Heffernan 
 Chihee Rhee 
 Jan Hoffmann 
 Evgeni Rokhin

Ice dancing

Referee:
 Mieko Fujimori 

Technical Controller:
 Gilles Vandenbroeck 

Technical Specialist:
 Andrzej Dostatni 

Assistant Technical Specialist:
 April Sargent Silverstein 

Judges for the compulsory dance (rumba):
 Rossella Ceccattini 
 Irina Medvedeva 
 Alla Shekhovtseva 
 Garry Hoppe 
 Maria Miller 
 Shawn Rettstatt 
 Jodi Abbott 
 Evgeni Rokhin 
 Hongguo Ren 
 Elizabeth Ryan 
 Olga Zakova 
 Ulf Denzer 

Judges for the original dance:
 Maria Miller 
 Raia Bisserova-Bakalova 
 Laimute Krauziene 
 Mayumi Kato 
 Alla Shekhovtseva 
 Elizabeth Ryan 
 Ulf Denzer 
 Irina Medvedeva 
 Jodi Abbott 
 Olga Zakova 
 Rossella Ceccattini 
 Shawn Rettstatt 

Judges for the free dance:
 Mayumi Kato 
 Elizabeth Ryan 
 Raia Bisserova-Bakalova 
 Jodi Abbott 
 Shawn Rettstatt 
 Maria Miller 
 Rossella Ceccattini 
 Hongguo Ren 
 Ulf Denzer 
 Olga Zakova 
 Laimute Krauziene 
 Garry Hoppe

Multiple entries for 2008
The following countries secured multiple entries for the 2008 championships based on their performances at the 2007 Worlds.

Prize money
The total prize money for the 2007 World Figure Skating Championships is US$710,000. Pairs and dance teams split the money. All amounts are in US dollars. The breakdown is as follows:

References

External links

 
 Official site

Further reading
 Figure Skating Today: The Next Wave of Stars by Steve Milton and Gerard Chataigneau (Nov 2, 2007)

World Championships
World Figure Skating Championships
World Figure Skating Championships
International figure skating competitions hosted by Japan
Sports competitions in Tokyo
World Figure Skating Championships
March 2007 sports events in Asia